Mahmoud Mokhtar (12 October 1905 – 21 February 1965) was an Egyptian footballer. A prolific striker, he scored 9 goals in 10 international matches for Egypt. He represented Egypt at the 1928 Summer Olympics and the 1936 Summer Olympics.

Career statistics

International goals

References

See also
Mokhtar El-Tetsh Stadium
Saleh Selim

1905 births
1965 deaths
Egyptian footballers
Al Ahly SC players
Egypt international footballers
1934 FIFA World Cup players
Olympic footballers of Egypt
Footballers at the 1924 Summer Olympics
Footballers at the 1928 Summer Olympics
Footballers at the 1936 Summer Olympics
Association football forwards
Footballers from Cairo